19,20-Dihydroervahanine A is an alkaloid, a natural product which is found in the root of the South-East Asian plant Tabernaemontana divaricata. It inhibits acetylcholinesterase more potently than galantamine in vitro.

See also 
 Coronaridine
 Ibogamine

References 

Tryptamine alkaloids
Acetylcholinesterase inhibitors